Connie Östlund (born 22 February 1960) is a Swedish curler.

In 2015 he was inducted into the Swedish Curling Hall of Fame.

Teams

Personal life
Connie Östlund is married to Bitte Berg-Östlund, former Swedish curler, she played for Sweden on World and European championships.

References

External links
 

Living people
1960 births
Swedish male curlers
Swedish curling champions